The Rio del Oso is an intermittent stream in Rio Arriba County, New Mexico.  It is tributary to the Rio Chama after crossing under U.S. Route 84 near Chili, New Mexico (in zip code 87537 between Hernandez and Medanales).

The alluvial record in the lower valley of the Rio del Oso is well dated and is unusual in that it includes a single Holocene terrace, a few thousand years old.

References

Rivers of New Mexico